Love That Girl! is an American sitcom that airs on TV One and debuted on January 19, 2010. The series started off as a four episode, independently produced series presentation that aired as a special three-night event, and was later ordered to series on October 15, 2010. Love That Girl! is the first scripted series for the network. The series went on hiatus until TV One announced in May 2013, that the series would return for its fourth season on October 11, 2013. Tatyana Ali did not return for the fourth season due to a contract agreement with the BET series, Second Generation Wayans.

Plot
Seasons 1 to 3 revolve around Tyana Jones (Tatyana Ali), a recent young divorcee returning to southern California who is in search of new independence, a new career and a new chapter in her book of life. In Season 4,  (Bresha Webb) is still working at Del-Jones Realty while Latrell (Alphonso McAuley) is continuing on jump-starting his stand-up comedian career. The new member of the cast is Jasmine Russell (Reagan Gomez); she is Delroy’s niece from Ohio, who relocated to Los Angeles in hopes of becoming a sports reporter.

Cast
 Tatyana Ali (seasons 1–3), as Tyana Jones
 Bresha Webb as Immunique Jefferson
 Phil Morris as Delroy Jones
 Mark Adair-Rios as Adonis
 Alphonso McAuley as Latrell Jones
 Peter Oldring as Fabian
 Huggy Lowdown as himself
 Kendyll Joi (seasons 1–3), as Nefertiti Carter
 Reagan Gomez-Preston (season 4) as Jasmine Russel

Episodes

Series overview

Season 1: 2010

Season 2: 2011

Season 3: 2011-2012

Season 4: 2013-2014

Ratings

Season 1: 2010

Season 2: 2011

Season 3: 2011-2012

References

External links
 

2010s American black sitcoms
2010 American television series debuts
2014 American television series endings
English-language television shows
Television shows set in California
TV One (American TV channel) original programming